Eric Kelly (born January 15, 1977) is a former American football defensive back in the National Football League. He played for the Minnesota Vikings from 2001–2003. He was selected as a cornerback by the Vikings in the 3rd round (69th overall) of the 2001 NFL Draft. Prior to the 2004 season, he re-signed with the Minnesota Vikings on April 13, 2004, but got cut on June 18, 2004 after asking for his release after sliding on the depth chart. He signed with the Houston Texans off of waivers on June 28, 2004, but got cut due to not taking a pay cut. Then he signed with the Chicago Bears on August 8, 2004, but got cut due to injury.

Eric starred for the University of Kentucky Wildcats from 1997–2000, where he was usually asked to play man-to-man coverage with the best receiver of the opposition.
Kelly graduated from Bay High School in Panama City, Florida in 1997, where he played running back and outside linebacker.  There, under head coach Jim Scroggins, he led the "Fightin' Tornados" to a 23-5 record his last two years in high school, including trips to the Florida state quarter-finals and a narrow loss in the state championship game.

Notes 

1977 births
Living people
People from Panama City, Florida
Players of American football from Milwaukee
Players of American football from Florida
American football cornerbacks
Kentucky Wildcats football players
Minnesota Vikings players
Ed Block Courage Award recipients